These are the official results of the Men's 110 metres Hurdles event at the 1987 IAAF World Championships in Rome, Italy. There were a total number of 39 participating athletes, with five qualifying heats, two semi-finals and the final held on Thursday September 3, 1987.

Medalists

Records
Existing records at the start of the event.

Final

Semi-finals
Held on Tuesday 1987-09-01

Qualifying heats
Held on Tuesday 1987-09-01

See also
 1983 Men's World Championships 110m Hurdles (Helsinki)
 1984 Men's Olympic 110m Hurdles (Los Angeles)
 1986 Men's European Championships 110m Hurdles (Stuttgart)
 1988 Men's Olympic 110m Hurdles (Seoul)
 1991 Men's World Championships 110m Hurdles (Tokyo)

References
 Results

H
Sprint hurdles at the World Athletics Championships